The West Riding County Cup is an annual football competition held between the clubs of the West Riding County Football Association which was first competed in 1927.  It is the senior county cup for the historic West Riding of Yorkshire since the demise of the Senior Cup in 1999. The first winners were Leeds United Reserves in 1927.

According to the Rules of the County FA, entry to the competition is by invite from the Council or an authorised committee assigned to run the competition.

Past winners

The competition was not held between 1933 and 1950

Finals

2001 Final

2002 Final

2003 Final

2004 Final

2005 Final

2006 Final

2007 Final

2008 Final

2009 Final

2010 Final

2011 Final

2012 Final

2013 Final

2014 Final

2015 Final

2019 Final

2022 Final

References

 

County Cup competitions
Football competitions in Yorkshire
Football in West Yorkshire